Gerrit Fokkema  Born in Port Moresby, Papua New Guinea in 1954 and moved to Australia in 1958.

Education 
Gerrit Fokkema attended the NSW public system primary and secondary schools in Queanbeyan, NSW. graduating with a Higher School Certificate in 1972.

Fokkema's formal photographic education was at Canberra Technical College, Canberra, ACT  from 1974 to 1977 , Photography Certificate.

Career 
Fokkema worked as a news photographer from 1975 to 1984.

He began as a cadet photographer with The Canberra Times, and worked there for four years, 1975 to 1979.

He then moved to Sydney and worked at The Sydney Morning Herald for four years, from 1980 to 1984.

For the next three years Fokkema worked at The Good Weekend Magazine, a colour magazine supplement to the Saturday edition of The Sydney Morning Herald.

He was self employed from 1987 to 2018, working in association with design and architectural firms, producing images used in corporate marketing, communications and Annual Reports for some of Australia's largest companies.

Photography 
Gerrit's living was made producing images for first newspapers, (The Canberra Times, The Sydney Morning Herald)and later for corporate and commercial clients.

The short term focus of daily news production frustrated Fokkema's inclination to engage more deeply in subjects, so on weekends and holiday's he pursued his own personal projects.

That combination of commercial work and a need for self expression meant that Gerrit could fund his personal projects through commercial activities and maintain independence.

"Recognised in the late seventies as one of the new generation, Gerrit Fokkema extended the documentary genre of photographers such as Dupain, Moore, Quirk, Scott and Tweedie.

He pictured Canberra, then Sydney, and later regional areas such as Wilcannia, with wry humour, irony and an empathy for both built and natural environments and the characters and animals which inhabited the spaces.

Fokkema's high degree of technical skill and sophisticated rendering of light resulted in sumptuous, silvery prints with strong formal and aesthetic qualities"

- Christine Godden, Director of Australian Centre for Photography 1978 to 1983

- from "Signature Works" catalogue published in 1999 to celebrate 25 years since the start of The Australian Centre for Photography

Exhibitions

Individual exhibitions
•   2018    Wilcannia Photographs 1983 to 2016  -  River Meeting Gallery, Queens Head, Wilcannia

•  2000     Otherdaze   -   Byron Mapp Gallery, Sydney

•  1995     Family   -   Byron Mapp Gallery, Sydney

•  1983     Somedaze II   -   Images Gallery, Sydney

•  1979     Gerrit Fokkema   -   The Australian Centre for Photography, Sydney

•  1978     Somedaze I  - Susan Gillespie Galleries, Canberra

Group exhibitions
•   2021    Finalist and Highly Commended in The Olive Cotton Award for Photographic Portraiture, Tweed Regional Gallery.

•   2020    Paper Tigers : Australian Photojournalists. - HeadOn Photo Festival, Sydney

•   2019    Untitled & Unfinished  -  HeadOn Photo Festival, Sydney.

•   2017    Wilcannia Stories  HeadOn Photo Festival, Sydney.

•   2016    Demolished Sydney  -  Museum of Sydney.

•   2015    Finalist - Bowness Photography prize  MGA, Victoria.

•   2014    The Road : photographer on the move 1970 - 1985  -  MGA, Victoria.

•   2014    Australian Vernacular Photography  -  Art Gallery of NSW, Sydney.

•   2008    Finalist, Josephine Ulrick and Win Shubert Photography Award, Gold Coast, Queensland.

•   2007    Sydney Now : New Australian Photojournalism, Museum of Sydney.

•   2007    Finalist, Josephine Ulrick and Win Shubert Photography Award, Gold Coast, Queensland.

•   2006    In Transit  -  Alliance Franciase, Sydney.

•   2006    Finalist Josephine Ulrick & Win Shubert Photography Award, Gold Coast, Queensland.

•   2005    Wastelands - A Poetic Legacy   The Art Gallery of NSW, Sydney.

•   2005    Eye 4 Photography  -  The State Library of NSW, Sydney.

•   2004    Australian Postwar Photodocumentary  -  The Art Gallery of NSW, Sydney

•   2002    Re Presenting The Real - Documentary Photography 2002  -  Stills Gallery, Sydney.

•   2002    The Home Front  -  Canberra Contemporary Art Space.

•   2002    Reporting The World - John Pilger's Great Eyewitness Photographers  -  The Museum of Contemporary Art, Sydney.

•   2001    Belonging : A century Celebrated   -   The State Library of NSW, Sydney

•   2000    My City of Sydney   -   Art gallery of NSW, Sydney.

•   1999    4th Birthday Exhibition  -  Byron Mapp Gallery, Sydney.

•   1999    Signature Works, 25th Anniversary Exhibition  -  The Australian Centre for Photography, Sydney.

•   1999    Living In The Seventies  -  Canberra Museum and Gallery.

•   1999    Site : The Parliament House Construction Photography Project   -   Parliament House, Canberra.

•   1997    Econtros da Imagem  -  Braga, Portrugal.

•   1994    Sydney Photographed  -  Museum of Contemporary Art, Sydney.

•   1988    Shades of Light - Photography and Australia 1839 to 1988   -   The Australian National Gallery, Canberra.

•   1987    Living in the 70's : Australian photographs - The Australian National Gallery, Canberra.

•   1976
10 Viewpoints  -  Australian Centre for Photography, Sydney.

•   1975    18th Sydney International Exhibition of Photography, Sydney Town Hall.

References

Australian photographers
1954 births
Living people